Daisy Tahan is an American actress best known for her role as Samantha Focker in Little Fockers. Tahan also originated the role of Fiona Peyton in the Showtime series Nurse Jackie. Daisy, the younger sister of actor Charlie Tahan, lives in Glen Rock, New Jersey.

Filmography

Film

Television

References

External links

American child actresses
American film actresses
American television actresses
Place of birth missing (living people)
Year of birth missing (living people)
Living people
People from Glen Rock, New Jersey
21st-century American actresses
Actresses from New Jersey